Raw Deluxe is the fourth album by American hip hop group the Jungle Brothers. It was released on June 3, 1997 via Gee Street Records. Set to be distributed through Island/PolyGram, with which Gee Street had a distribution deal (a catalog number had been issued), this became the first Gee Street title to be distributed by V2/BMG after the label's purchase by Richard Branson.

Track listing
 "Jungle Brother (True Blue)" – 4:07
 "Changes" – 3:50
 "Black Man on Track" – 4:37
 "Toe to Toe" – 3:58
 "Moving Along" – 4:43
 "Gettin Money" – 4:09
 "Where You Wanna Go" – 3:16
 "Brain" – 4:56
 "Handle My Business" – 3:51
 "How Ya Want It We Got It" (Native Tongues Remix) – 4:35
 "Bring It On" – 4:21
 "Jungle Brother" (Stereo MC's Mix) – 5:05

Charts

References

1997 albums
V2 Records albums
Jungle Brothers albums
Gee Street Records albums